Salvarezza is an Italian surname. Notable people with the surname include:

 Antonio Salvarezza (1902–1985), Italian tenor
 Roberto Salvarezza (born 1952), Argentine biochemist, researcher, and politician

Italian-language surnames